Acacia flagelliformis is a shrub belonging to the genus Acacia and the subgenus Phyllodineae that is endemic to an area of south western Australia.

It is native to an area in the South West region of Western Australia where it is found in winter wet areas growing in sandy soils.

See also
List of Acacia species

References

flagelliformis
Acacias of Western Australia
Plants described in 1978